Il colombre is a 1966 short story collection by the Italian writer Dino Buzzati. The titular story introduces a sea monster called the colomber, which became the most famous of Buzzati's monster characters.

Stories

 Il colombre: storia non vera
 La creazione
 La lezione del 1980
 Generale ignoto
 L'erroneo fu
 L'umiltà
 E se?
 Riservatissima al signor direttore
 L'arma segreta
 Un torbido amore
 Povero bambino!
 Il seccatore
 Il conto
 Week-end
 Il segreto dello scrittore
 Storielle della sera
 Cacciatori di vecchi
 L'uovo
 Diciottesima buca
 La giacca stregata
 Il cane vuoto
 Dolce notte
 L'ascensore
 I sorpassi
 L'ubiquo
 Il vento
 Teddy boys
 Il palloncino
 Suicidio al parco
 Il crollo del santo
 Schiavo
 La torre Eiffel
 Ragazza che precipita
 Il mago
 La barattola
 L'altare
 Le gobbe in giardino
 Piccola Circe
 Il logorio
 Quiz all'ergastolo
 Jago
 Progressioni
 I due autisti

Viaggio agli inferni del secolo
 I - Un servizio difficile
 II - I segreti della <<MM>>
 III - Le diavolesse
 IV - Le accelerazioni
 V - Le solitudini
 VI - L'Entrümpelung
 VII - Belva al volante
 VIII - Il giardino

Publication
The collection was published in Italy in 1966 through Arnoldo Mondadori Editore. It has not been published in English in its entirety, but some of the stories, including "Colomber", have been translated by Lawrence Venuti and appear in the 1984 volume Restless Nights: Selected Stories of Dino Buzzati.

References

External links
 Publicity page at the Italian publisher's website 

1966 short story collections
Italian short story collections
Italian-language literature
Works by Dino Buzzati
Arnoldo Mondadori Editore books